İmran Kılıç (1956/1957 – 18 November 2021) was a Turkish politician who served as a member of the Grand National Assembly of Turkey from 2015 till his death in 2021 from COVID-19 in Ankara during the COVID-19 pandemic in Turkey.

References

1950s births
2021 deaths
Turkish politicians
Members of the Grand National Assembly of Turkey
Deaths from the COVID-19 pandemic in Turkey